Stéphanie Galzy (born October 21, 1981) is a French politician for the National Rally who has been the Member of the National Assembly for Hérault's 5th constituency since 2022.

Biography
Galzy was born in Pézenas and grew up in Agde. She has described herself as a single mother in an interview with France3. 

She first joined the National Rally in 2014 and worked as a local organizer and activist for the party. During the 2022 French legislative election, she was elected to Hérault's 5th constituency.

As a candidate for the National Rally in the French legislative elections of 2022, she was elected deputy for the fifth constituency of Hérault on June 19, 2022 with 54.24% of the votes cast, against Pierre Polard, the NUPES-LFI candidate and Mayor of Capestang.

References

1981 births
Living people
National Rally (France) politicians
Deputies of the 16th National Assembly of the French Fifth Republic
Women members of the National Assembly (France)
21st-century French women politicians